Alocasia portei is a species of flowering plant in the family Araceae, native to Luzon in the Philippines. With Alocasia odora it is the pollen parent of the large landscaping plant Alocasia × portora.

References

portei
House plants
Endemic flora of the Philippines
Flora of Luzon
Plants described in 1862